Zoe Atkin (born 16 January 2003) is a British freestyle skier.

Career
She participated at the halfpipe event at the FIS Freestyle Ski and Snowboarding World Championships 2021 winning a bronze medal. She is the younger sister of fellow skier Izzy Atkin; both were born in the United States to an English father and Malaysian mother, and have competed for Great Britain from a young age.

References

External links

Living people
2003 births
British female freestyle skiers
X Games athletes
Sportspeople from Boston
American emigrants to the United Kingdom
American people of Malaysian descent
American people of English descent
British people of Malaysian descent
Freestyle skiers at the 2022 Winter Olympics
Olympic freestyle skiers of Great Britain